Union National Bank (UNB) was a bank based in Abu Dhabi, United Arab Emirates, from 1982 until it merged with Abu Dhabi Commercial Bank in 2019.

It was established as a Public Joint Stock Company in 1982 became one of the UAE's leading domestic banks in the United Arab Emirates. The bank offered a variety of products and services to individuals and corporations. It had 50-plus branches and banking centers.

In 2006, the Bank acquired the Alexandria Commercial and Maritime Bank, which was established in 1981 in Alexandria, Egypt, in a privatization.

Board of directors

Sheikh Nahyan Bin Mubarak Al Nahyan
Rashed Darweesh Ahmad Al Ketbi  Member
Ahmad Saeed Mohammed Al Badi Al Dahiri  Member
Mohmmed Ahmad Al Bowardi Al Flasi  Member
Ahmed Yousef Abdullah Al Sayegh  Member
Mohammed Rashid Ahmad Al Nasri  Member
Sami Ahmad Dhaen Al Qamzi  Member
Butti Saeed Mohammed Al Kindi  Member

Stock listing
The bank had its shares listed in ADX under the symbol UNB.

References

 ADX shares quote 
SCA shares quote SCA |Companies

External links
 UNB Official Website

Banks established in 1982
Companies based in Abu Dhabi
Bank of Credit and Commerce International
2019 mergers and acquisitions
Defunct banks of the United Arab Emirates
Emirati companies established in 1982